Wye House is a historic residence and former headquarters of a historic plantation house northwest of Easton in rural Talbot County, Maryland. Built in 1781–1784, it is a high-quality and well-proportioned example of a wooden-frame Southern plantation house. It was designated a National Historic Landmark in 1970.

History
The Wye plantation was created in the 1650s by a Welsh Puritan and wealthy planter, Edward Lloyd. Between 1780 and 1790, the main house was built by his great-great-grandson, Edward Lloyd IV, using the profits generated by the forced labor of enslaved people. It is cited as an example between the transition of Georgian and Federal architecture, which is attributed to builder Robert Key. Nearby the house is an orangery, a rare survival of an early garden structure where orange and lemon trees were cultivated, and which still contains its original 18th-century heating system of hot-air ducts.

Though the land has shrunk to  today, it is still owned by the descendants of Edward Lloyd, now in their 11th generation on the property. Frederick Douglass was enslaved on the plantation, from around the ages of seven and eight, and spoke extensively of the brutal conditions of the plantation in his autobiography, Narrative of the Life of Frederick Douglass, an American Slave.

Modern situation
The nearby hamlets of Unionville and Copperville are now home to many descendants of the people who were enslaved at Wye House. This has created an interesting dynamic, with the descendants of the enslavers and the enslaved living within a very short distance of one another.

The Wye House plantation gained media attention in 2006 for archaeological investigations led by the University of Maryland.

In 2011, excavation of the greenhouse, built by enslaved African people, brought a discovery of African charms laid to ward off bad spirits at the house's furnace and entrance.

See also

 Chase–Lloyd House, a National Historic Landmark in Annapolis, Maryland, owned by the Lloyd family 1771–1847.
 List of National Historic Landmarks in Maryland
 National Register of Historic Places listings in Talbot County, Maryland

References

External links
 Where Land and Water Intertwine: An Architectural History of Talbot County
 , including undated, at Maryland Historical Trust
Frederick Douglass Birthplace Driving Tour
 
 
 Wye House, Mansion, Bruffs Island Road, Tunis Mills vicinity, Talbot, MD at the Historic American Buildings Survey (HABS)
 Wye House, Captain's House, Bruffs Island Road, Tunis Mills vicinity, Talbot, MD at HABS
 Wye House, Cemetery, Bruffs Island Road, Tunis Mills vicinity, Talbot, MD at HABS
 Wye House, Corn Crib, Bruffs Island Road, Tunis Mills vicinity, Talbot, MD at HABS
 Wye House, Orangery, Bruffs Island Road, Tunis Mills vicinity, Talbot, MD at HABS
 Wye House, Smokehouse, Bruffs Island Road, Tunis Mills vicinity, Talbot, MD at HABS

National Historic Landmarks in Maryland
Houses on the National Register of Historic Places in Maryland
Archaeological sites on the National Register of Historic Places in Maryland
Houses completed in 1781
Plantation houses in Maryland
Houses in Talbot County, Maryland
Welsh-American history
Welsh-American culture in Maryland
Historic American Buildings Survey in Maryland
National Register of Historic Places in Talbot County, Maryland
Lloyd family of Maryland
Frederick Douglass